4-nitrophenol 4-monooxygenase (pnpA (gene), pdcA (gene)) is an enzyme with systematic name 4-nitrophenol,NAD(P)H:oxygen 4-oxidoreductase (4-hydroxylating, nitrite-forming). This enzyme catalyses the following chemical reaction

 4-nitrophenol + NADPH + H+ + O2  1,4-benzoquinone + nitrite + NADP+ + H2O

4-nitrophenol 4-monooxygenase contains FAD.

References

External links 
 

EC 1.14.13